The 2005–06 Red Bull Barako season was the sixth season of the franchise in the Philippine Basketball Association (PBA).

Key dates
August 14: The 2005 PBA Draft took place in Sta. Lucia East Grand Mall, Cainta, Rizal.

Draft picks

Roster

Fiesta Conference

Game log

|- bgcolor="#edbebf"
| 1
| October 2
| Purefoods
| 77–84
| Greer (37)
| 
| 
| Araneta Coliseum
| 0–1
|- bgcolor="#bbffbb"
| 2
| October 9
| Alaska
| 76-75 
| Greer (40)
| 
| 
| Araneta Coliseum
| 1–1
|- bgcolor="#edbebf"
| 3
| October 14
| Brgy.Ginebra
| 
| 
|
| 
| Cuneta Astrodome
| 1–2
|- bgcolor="#bbffbb"
| 4
| October 16
| Air21
| 84-77
| Greer (25)
| 
| 
| Araneta Coliseum
| 2–2 
|- bgcolor="#bbffbb"
| 5
| October 23
| San Miguel
| 76-74
| Greer (23)
| 
| 
| Araneta Coliseum
| 3–2 
|- bgcolor="#bbffbb"
| 6
| October 28
| Sta.Lucia
| 95-78
| Greer (28)
| 
| 
| Cuneta Astrodome
| 4–2 

|- bgcolor="#edbebf"
| 7
| November 2
| Alaska
| 64–81
| Greer (17)
| 
| 
| Cuneta Astrodome
| 4–3
|- bgcolor="#edbebf"
| 8
| November 5
| Coca Cola
| 64–82
| Greer (16)
| 
| 
| Tacloban City
| 4–4
|- bgcolor="#bbffbb"
| 9
| November 11
| Brgy.Ginebra
| 
| 
| 
| 
| Araneta Coliseum
| 5–4
|- bgcolor="#edbebf"
| 10
| November 13
| Purefoods
| 95–97
| Greer (34)
| 
| 
| Araneta Coliseum
| 5–5
|- bgcolor="#bbffbb"
| 11
| November 18
| Talk 'N Text
| 91-89
| Greer (24)
| 
| 
| Ynares Center
| 6–5
|- bgcolor="#bbffbb"
| 12
| November 20
| Talk 'N Text
| 99-92 
| Tugade (28)
| 
| 
| Cuneta Astrodome
| 7–5

|- bgcolor="#edbebf"
| 13
| December 6 
| San Miguel
| 77–83
| Greer (27)
| 
| 
| Iloilo City
| 7–6
|- bgcolor="#edbebf"
| 14
| December 9 
| Sta.Lucia
| 104–105 (2OT)
| Greer (29)
| 
| 
| Cuneta Astrodome
| 7–7
|- bgcolor="#bbffbb"
| 15
| December 14
| Air21
| 
| 
| 
| 
| Cuneta Astrodome
| 8–7 
|- bgcolor="#bbffbb"
| 16
| December 23
| Coca Cola
| 78-77
| Greer (24)
| 
| 
| Cuneta Astrodome
| 9–7

Transactions

Additions

Subtractions
{| cellspacing="0"
| valign="top" |

References

Barako Bull Energy Boosters seasons
Red Bull